UFC 261: Usman vs. Masvidal 2 was a mixed martial arts event produced by the Ultimate Fighting Championship that took place on April 24, 2021 at VyStar Veterans Memorial Arena in Jacksonville, Florida, United States.

Background
The promotion had initially planned to hold the event in Singapore. However, negotiations with the Singaporean government fizzled amongst COVID-19 protocols and the promotion initially turned to their home base of Las Vegas. On March 15, UFC president Dana White announced the event would be moved to Jacksonville, Florida, with a full capacity of "15,000 UFC fans", marking the first time since UFC 248 in March 2020 that a full capacity crowd would be available (the UFC hosted a trio of events in Abu Dhabi in January with a limited number of fans). Jacksonville also hosted the UFC's first fights back after the start of the COVID-19 pandemic in May 2020, before the organization started hosting events in either Las Vegas or Abu Dhabi.

A UFC Welterweight Championship rematch between the current champion Kamaru Usman (also The Ultimate Fighter: American Top Team vs. Blackzilians welterweight winner) and Jorge Masvidal headlined the event. They previously met at UFC 251, where Usman defended his title via unanimous decision.

A UFC Women's Strawweight Championship bout between the current champion Zhang Weili and former champion Rose Namajunas took place as the co-main event.

A UFC Women's Flyweight Championship bout between current champion Valentina Shevchenko and former strawweight champion Jéssica Andrade completed the triad of title fights.

A middleweight rematch between former UFC Middleweight Champion Chris Weidman and Uriah Hall was expected to take place at UFC 258 in February. They met previously in September 2010 at a Ring of Combat event for the organization's middleweight title, with Weidman winning via TKO. However, Weidman was pulled from that event in late-January due to a positive COVID-19 test. The pairing remained intact and eventually took place at this event.

Johnny Walker was expected to face Jimmy Crute in a light heavyweight bout. However, Walker pulled out due to an injury and was replaced by former UFC Light Heavyweight Championship challenger Anthony Smith.

Randy Brown and Alex Oliveira were expected to meet in a welterweight bout at UFC Fight Night: Rozenstruik vs. Gane, but Brown pulled out due to undisclosed reasons. They eventually fought each other at this event.

A bantamweight bout between Mark Striegl and Johnny Muñoz was expected to take place at the event. However, Striegl was removed from the bout on March 24 due to undisclosed reasons and replaced by Jamey Simmons. In turn, Simmons also pulled out on April 8 for undisclosed reasons. As a result, Muñoz was removed from the card as well and will be rescheduled for a future event.

Results

Bonus awards
The following fighters received $50,000 bonuses.
Fight of the Night: Jeff Molina vs. Aori Qileng
Performance of the Night: Kamaru Usman and Rose Namajunas

See also 

 List of UFC events
 List of current UFC fighters
 2021 in UFC

References 

Ultimate Fighting Championship events
2021 in mixed martial arts
April 2021 sports events in the United States
2021 in sports in Florida
Events in Jacksonville, Florida
Mixed martial arts in Florida
Sports competitions in Jacksonville, Florida